3rd district or 3rd constituency may refer to:

France

Metropolitan France 
 Ain's 3rd constituency
Aisne's 3rd constituency
Allier's 3rd constituency
Alpes-Maritimes's 3rd constituency
Ardèche's 3rd constituency
Ardennes's 3rd constituency
Aube's 3rd constituency
Aude's 3rd constituency
Aveyron's 3rd constituency
Bouches-du-Rhône's 3rd constituency
Calvados's 3rd constituency
Charente's 3rd constituency
Charente-Maritime's 3rd constituency
Cher's 3rd constituency
Côte-d'Or's 3rd constituency
Côtes-d'Armor's 3rd constituency
Dordogne's 3rd constituency
Doubs's 3rd constituency
Drôme's 3rd constituency
Eure's 3rd constituency
Eure-et-Loir's 3rd constituency
Finistère's 3rd constituency
Gard's 3rd constituency
Gironde's 3rd constituency
Haute-Garonne's 3rd constituency
Hérault's 3rd constituency
Ille-et-Vilaine's 3rd constituency
Indre-et-Loire's 3rd constituency
Isère's 3rd constituency
Jura's 3rd constituency
Landes's 3rd constituency
Loir-et-Cher's 3rd constituency
Loire's 3rd constituency
Loire-Atlantique's 3rd constituency
Loiret's 3rd constituency
Lot-et-Garonne's 3rd constituency
Maine-et-Loire's 3rd constituency
Manche's 3rd constituency
Marne's 3rd constituency
Mayenne's 3rd constituency
Meurthe-et-Moselle's 3rd constituency
Morbihan's 3rd constituency
Moselle's 3rd constituency
Nièvre's 3rd constituency
Nord's 3rd constituency
Oise's 3rd constituency
Orne's 3rd constituency
Pas-de-Calais's 3rd constituency
Puy-de-Dôme's 3rd constituency
Pyrénées-Atlantiques's 3rd constituency
Pyrénées-Orientales's 3rd constituency
Bas-Rhin's 3rd constituency
Haut-Rhin's 3rd constituency
Rhône's 3rd constituency
Sarthe's 3rd constituency
Savoie's 3rd constituency
Haute-Savoie's 3rd constituency
Paris's 3rd constituency
Saône-et-Loire's 3rd constituency
Seine-Maritime's 3rd constituency
Seine-et-Marne's 3rd constituency
Somme's 3rd constituency
Yvelines's 3rd constituency
Deux-Sèvres's 3rd constituency
Tarn's 3rd constituency
Var's 3rd constituency
Vaucluse's 3rd constituency
Vendée's 3rd constituency
Vienne's 3rd constituency
Haute-Vienne's 3rd constituency
Vosges's 3rd constituency
Yonne's 3rd constituency
Essonne's 3rd constituency
Hauts-de-Seine's 3rd constituency
Seine-Saint-Denis's 3rd constituency
Val-de-Marne's 3rd constituency
Val-d'Oise's 3rd constituency

Overseas territories 

 French Polynesia's 3rd constituency
 Guadeloupe's 3rd constituency
 Martinique's 3rd constituency
 Réunion's 3rd constituency
 Third constituency for French residents overseas

Japan 

Gunma 3rd district (1947–93)
Fukushima 3rd district
 Hokkaido 3rd district
 Hokkaido 3rd district (1947–1993)
 Kagoshima 3rd district
Kyoto 3rd district
 Kyoto 3rd district (1928–42)
 Iwate 3rd district
 Mie 3rd district
Nagano 3rd district
Saitama 3rd district
 Tokyo 3rd district
Okinawa 3rd district
 Wakayama 3rd district
Yamaguchi 3rd district

Philippines 

 Batangas's 3rd congressional district
Bohol's 3rd congressional district
Cagayan's 3rd congressional district
Cavite's 3rd congressional district
Cebu's 3rd congressional district
Iloilo's 3rd congressional district
Leyte's 3rd congressional district
Manila's 3rd congressional district
Pangasinan's 3rd congressional district
Quezon's 3rd congressional district
Quezon City's 3rd congressional district
Samar's 3rd congressional district

Poland 
 District of the Western Pomerania (3rd District)

United States

Alabama 
 Alabama's 3rd congressional district
 Alabama House of Representatives, District 3
 Alabama Senate, District 3

Arkansas 
 Arkansas's 3rd congressional district

Arizona 
 Arizona's 3rd congressional district
 Arizona's 3rd legislative district

California 
 California's 3rd district (disambiguation)

Colorado 
 Colorado's 3rd congressional district
 Colorado's 3rd Senate district

Connecticut 
 Connecticut's 3rd congressional district
 Connecticut's 3rd assembly district

Delaware 
 Delaware's 3rd Senate district

Florida 
 Florida's 3rd congressional district

Georgia 
 Georgia's 3rd congressional district
 Georgia's 3rd Senate district

Illinois 
 Illinois's 3rd congressional district

Kansas 
 Kansas's 3rd congressional district
 Kansas's 3rd Senate district

Louisiana 
 Louisiana's 3rd congressional district
 Louisiana's 3rd State Senate district

Maine 
 Maine's 3rd congressional district

Maryland 
 Maryland's 3rd congressional district

Massachusetts 
 Massachusetts's 3rd congressional district
 Massachusetts Senate's 3rd Essex district
 Massachusetts Senate's 3rd Middlesex district
 Massachusetts House of Representatives' 3rd Barnstable district
 Massachusetts House of Representatives' 3rd Berkshire district
 Massachusetts House of Representatives' 3rd Bristol district
 Massachusetts House of Representatives' 3rd Essex district
 Massachusetts House of Representatives' 3rd Hampden district
 Massachusetts House of Representatives' 3rd Hampshire district
 Massachusetts House of Representatives' 3rd Middlesex district
 Massachusetts House of Representatives' 3rd Norfolk district
 Massachusetts House of Representatives' 3rd Plymouth district
 Massachusetts House of Representatives' 3rd Suffolk district
 Massachusetts House of Representatives' 3rd Worcester district

Michigan 
 Michigan's 3rd congressional district
 Michigan's 3rd House of Representatives district
 Michigan's 3rd Senate district

Minnesota 
 Minnesota's 3rd congressional district
 Minnesota Senate, District 3

Mississippi 
 Mississippi's 3rd congressional district

Missouri 
 Missouri's 3rd congressional district

Nebraska 
 Nebraska's 3rd congressional district

Nevada 
 Nevada's 3rd congressional district
 Nevada's 3rd Senate district

New Jersey 
 New Jersey's 3rd congressional district
 3rd Legislative District (New Jersey)

New Mexico 
 New Mexico's 3rd congressional district

New York

State 
 New York's 3rd congressional district
 New York's 3rd State Senate district

City 
 3rd District (New York City Council)

North Carolina 
 North Carolina's 3rd congressional district

Ohio 
 Ohio's 3rd congressional district

Oklahoma 
 Oklahoma's 3rd congressional district

Oregon 
 Oregon's 3rd congressional district
 Oregon's 3rd State House district

Pennsylvania 
 Pennsylvania's 3rd congressional district
 Pennsylvania House of Representatives, District 3
 Pennsylvania Senate, District 3

South Carolina 
 South Carolina's 3rd congressional district

Tennessee 
 Tennessee's 3rd congressional district
 Tennessee's 3rd Senate district

Texas 
 Texas's 3rd congressional district
 Texas House of Representatives, District 3
 Texas Senate, District 3

Utah 
 Utah's 3rd congressional district
 Utah's 3rd State Senate district

Virginia 
 Virginia's 3rd congressional district
 Virginia's 3rd Senate district
 Virginia's 3rd House of Delegates district

Washington State 
 Washington's 3rd congressional district

West Virginia 
 West Virginia's 3rd congressional district
 West Virginia's 3rd Senate district

Wisconsin 
 Wisconsin's 3rd congressional district
 Wisconsin Senate, District 3
 3rd District of the Wisconsin Assembly

Other 
 3rd District of Columbia Infantry Battalion

See also 
 District 3 (disambiguation)